Underwater breathing apparatus is equipment which allows the user to breathe underwater. 
The three major categories of ambient pressure underwater breathing apparatus are:
Open circuit scuba, where the diver carries the gas supply, and exhaled gas is exhausted to the environment
Rebreather scuba, where the diver carries the gas supply, and exhaled gas is recycled for further use, and
Surface supplied diving equipment, where the gas supply is provided from the surface through a hose in a diver's umbilical
Two other types may also be identified:
Escape sets provide a limited amount of breathing gas to allow the user to reach the surface from a disabled vessel or vehicle.
Atmospheric pressure underwater breathing apparatus is also used in the form of armoured atmospheric diving suits, which maintain an internal pressure approximating surface pressure.

Open circuit scuba 

A scuba set is any breathing apparatus that is carried entirely by an underwater diver and provides the diver with breathing gas at the ambient pressure. Although strictly speaking the scuba set is only the diving equipment which is required for providing breathing gas to the diver, general usage includes the harness by which it is carried, and those accessories which are integral parts of the harness and breathing apparatus assembly, such as a jacket or wing style buoyancy compensator and instruments mounted in a combined housing with the pressure gauge. In open-circuit demand scuba, the diver expels exhaled air to the environment, and requires each breath be delivered on demand by a diving regulator, which reduces the pressure from the storage cylinder. The breathing air is supplied through a demand valve when the diver reduces the pressure in the demand valve during inhalation.

Rebreather scuba 

A Diving rebreather recirculates the breathing gas already used by the diver after replacing oxygen used by the diver and removing the carbon dioxide metabolic product. Rebreather diving is used by recreational, military and scientific divers in applications where it has advantages over open circuit scuba, and surface supply of breathing gas is impracticable. The main advantages of rebreather diving are extended gas endurance, and lack of bubbles. Rebreathers are generally used for scuba applications, but are also occasionally used for bailout systems for surface supplied diving. Rebreathers are more complex to use than open circuit scuba, and have more potential points of failure, so acceptably safe use requires a greater level of skill, attention and situational awareness, which is usually derived from understanding the systems, diligent maintenance and overlearning the practical skills of operation and fault recovery.

Surface-supplied diving equipment 

The essential aspect of surface-supplied diving is that breathing gas is supplied from the surface, either from a specialized diving compressor, high-pressure cylinders, or both. In commercial and military surface-supplied diving, a backup source of breathing gas should always be present in case the primary supply fails. The diver may also wear a cylinder called a "bail-out bottle," which can provide self-contained breathing gas in an emergency. Thus, the surface-supplied diver is much less likely to have an "out-of-air" emergency than a scuba diver as there are normally two alternative air sources available.
Surface-supplied diving equipment usually includes communication capability with the surface, which adds to the safety and efficiency of the working diver.

Surface supplied diving includes diving using an umbilical with gas supply hose, lifeline strength member and communications cable, using a helmet or full-face mask, and diving with a simple air line, also known as hookah equipment.

Escape sets

An escape set is a self-contained breathing apparatus that allows its wearer to survive for a time in an environment without (sufficiently) breathable air. Early escape sets were rebreathers and were typically used to escape from disabled submarines that were unable to surface. One example is the Davis Submerged Escape Apparatus. Escape sets were also used ashore, e.g. in the mining industry, and for escape from tanks (Amphibious Tank Escape Apparatus). The small open-circuit scuba Helicopter Aircrew Breathing Device has the similar purpose of providing breathing gas to escape from a ditched helicopter.

Atmospheric diving suits 

An atmospheric diving suit (ADS) is a small one-person articulated anthropomorphic submersible which resembles a suit of armour, with elaborate pressure joints to allow articulation while maintaining an internal pressure of one atmosphere. Divers do not even need to be skilled swimmers.

References 

 
Diving environmental protection equipment